Alvin James "A. J." Moore Jr. (born December 15, 1995) is an American football safety for the Tennessee Titans of the National Football League (NFL). He played college football for the Ole Miss Rebels.

Early life and high school
Moore was born and grew up in Bassfield, Mississippi and attended Bassfield High School. He played both safety and running back for the Yellowjackets. As a senior, Moore was named first-team All-State by The Clarion-Ledger after he made 132 tackles, 11 tackles for loss and 3.5 sacks on defense and also rushed for five touchdowns as Bassfield went 15-1 and won the Class 2A state championship. He was a childhood friend and high school teammate of future Texans teammate Cornell Armstrong.

College career
Moore played four seasons for the Rebels, appearing in 39 games. Over the course of his collegiate career he accumulated 132 tackles, 10.5 tackles for loss, 2 forced fumbles, and 5 passes deflected. As a senior, Moore started all 12 of the Rebels' games at nickleback and registered 48 tackles, as well as a sack, a fumble recovery, and three passes deflected.

Professional career

New England Patriots
Moore signed with the New England Patriots as an undrafted free agent on April 30, 2018. He was waived by the Patriots at the end of the preseason as part of the team's final roster cuts.

Houston Texans
Moore was claimed off waivers by the Houston Texans on September 2, 2018. He made his NFL debut on September 9, 2018 during the Texans season opener against the Patriots. In his rookie season Moore appeared in all 16 of the Texans regular season games, playing exclusively on special teams and making a team-leading 11 tackles and recovering one fumble. In 2019, he played in all 16 of the Texans regular season games, appearing mostly on special teams but also playing 19 snaps on defense, with 14 total tackles and also played in both of the team's postseason games with one special teams tackle.

Moore was named a team captain by the Texans for the 2020 season. He was placed on injured reserve with a hamstring injury on September 28, 2020. He was activated on November 14, 2020. In Week 13 against the Indianapolis Colts, Moore recorded his first career sack on Philip Rivers during the 26–20 loss.

The Texans placed a restricted free agent tender on Moore on March 17, 2021. He signed the one-year contract on April 7. He was placed on injured reserve on September 2, 2021. He was activated on October 2, 2021.

Tennessee Titans
On March 21, 2022, Moore signed a one-year contract with the Tennessee Titans. He was placed on injured reserve on September 13, 2022.

Personal life
Moore has an identical twin brother, C. J. Moore, who was also a defensive back on the Ole Miss football team and now plays for the Detroit Lions. They played in the same defensive backfield for the Rebels.

References

External links
Ole Miss bio
Houston Texans bio

1995 births
Living people
People from Jefferson Davis County, Mississippi
Players of American football from Mississippi
American football cornerbacks
American football safeties
Ole Miss Rebels football players
New England Patriots players
Houston Texans players
Twin sportspeople
Tennessee Titans players